Ayvaz is both a masculine Turkish given name and a Turkish surname. Notable people with the name include:

Ayvaz Gökdemir (1942–2008), Turkish politician
Ayvaz Water, Turkish Spa town
Kazım Ayvaz (1938–2020), Turkish sport wrestler

See also
Ayvaz Water, Turkish Spa town
Ayvaz, Çardak

Turkish-language surnames
Turkish masculine given names